Micro-compounding refers to the mixing or processing of polymer formulations in the melt on a very small scale, typically several ml. The advantage of the use of a micro-compounder for R&D are significant: it gives faster, yet reliable results with much smaller samples and at much less investment costs, thus speeding up the innovation process in R&D of polymer materials, pharmaceutical, biomedical and nutritional applications.

Micro-compounding is typically performed with a table top, twin screw micro-compounder or -extruder with a working volume of 5 or 15 ml. With such small volumes it is almost impossible to have sufficient mixing in a continuous extruder. Therefore, state of the art micro-compounders have a batch mode (recirculation) and a conical shape. The L/D of a continuous twin screw extruder is mimicked in a batch micro-compounder by the recirculation mixing time, which is controlled by a manual valve. With this valve the recirculation can be interrupted to unload the formulation in either a strand, or an injection moulder, a film device or a fiber line. Typical recirculation times are 1-3 min, dependent on the ease of dispersive and distributive mixing of the formulation.

Benefits

With such table top laboratory equipment it is now also possible to produce films, fibers and test samples (rods, rings, tablets) from mixtures as small as 5 ml in less than 10 min. By the small footprint less lab space is needed than for a parallel twin screw extruder. Because of these benefits screening of optimum formulations in R&D is really feasible and affordable.

In pharmaceutical and biomedical R&D, where sample costs are a key issue, an easy to clean, 2 to 5 ml GMP compliant pharma micro-extruder was developed. This equipment is used for testing the improvement of bioavailability of poorly soluble drugs or realizing sustained release of dispersed or dissolved APIs. As pharmaceutical formulations are usually difficult to feed because of fluffy, static powders, this pharma micro-extruder has special options to easily fill and easily clean, which further speeds up the R&D process.

References

Polymer chemistry
Chemical processes